Colias thrasibulus, the lemon clouded yellow, is a small butterfly of the family Pieridae, that is, the yellows and whites. It is found in India.

See also
Pieridae
List of butterflies of India
List of butterflies of India (Pieridae)

References
 
  
 
 
 

thrasibulus
Fauna of Pakistan
Butterflies of Asia
Butterflies described in 1910